The Further Adventures of The Saw Doctors is a 2010 album by Irish rock group The Saw Doctors. It was their 7th studio album, long-awaited after the released of The Cure Album. It was released on 17 September 2010 in Ireland and on iTunes and was released on 27 September 2010 in the UK. It was sold on Amazon.com as part of a Limited Edition Set including the CD plus a bonus DVD. The album reached number 58 in the UK Album Chart in its first week.

Track listing
 "Takin' The Train"
 "Friday Town"
 "Someone Loves You"
 "Hazard"
 "Indian Summer"
 "Well Byes"
 "Be Yourself"
"Last Call"
 "As The Light Fades"
 "Songs and Stars"
 "Goodbye Again"

Personnel

The Band
Davy Carton - Vocals, Acoustic Guitar, 12 String Guitar, Electric Guitar, Piano, Backing Vocals
Leo Moran - Electric Guitars, Glockenspiel, Backing Vocals
Anthony Thistlethwaite - Bass guitar, Electric Mandolin, Backing Vocals
Eimhin Cradock - Drums, Percussion, Backing Vocals
Kevin Duffy - Keyboards, Backing Vocals
Ollie Jennings - Manager

Other
The Mavron Quartet - Strings on Someone Loves You
String arranged by Tim Lewis and Davy Carton
Produced by Philip Tennant
Engineered and Mixed by Adam Whittaker

Chart positions

References 

The Saw Doctors albums
2010 albums
2010 in Irish music